The Hilarimorphidae or hilarimorphid flies are a family of Diptera. They are of uncertain placement and may be related to the Acroceridae. Most species are Nearctic.

Species
Genus Cretahilarimorpha Myskowiak, Azar & Nel, 2016
Cretahilarimorpha lebanensis Myskowiak, Azar & Nel, 2016
Genus Hilarimorpha Schiner, 1860

Genus Hilarimorphites Grimaldi & Cumming, 1999 — extinct, known from  Cretaceous amber of New Jersey and Myanmar.

References

Brachycera families
Asiloidea
Taxa named by Friedrich Georg Hendel